Te Kawa is a rural community in the Ōtorohanga District and Waikato region of New Zealand's North Island. It lies just to the south of the volcanic hills of Kakepuku and Te Kawa. Until the swamp was drained in the 1900s, Te Kawa was well known for its eels.

Te Kawa railway station, a station on the North Island Main Trunk, was located in the area. It operated from 9 March 1887 and closed 17 October 1971.

A post office was open by 1909 and a dairy factory and a school existed in 1913. Te Kawa Bridge over the Waipā opened in 1915. A town hall opened in 1928.

Te Whakaaro Kotahi Marae in Te Kawa is a meeting ground of the Ngāti Maniapoto hapū of Te Kanawa. It includes a small building.

Demographics
Te Kawa settlement is in three SA1 statistical areas which cover . The SA1 areas are part of the larger Te Kawa statistical area.

The SA1 areas had a population of 504 at the 2018 New Zealand census, an increase of 84 people (20.0%) since the 2013 census, and an increase of 54 people (12.0%) since the 2006 census. There were 150 households, comprising 264 males and 246 females, giving a sex ratio of 1.07 males per female, with 147 people (29.2%) aged under 15 years, 96 (19.0%) aged 15 to 29, 210 (41.7%) aged 30 to 64, and 57 (11.3%) aged 65 or older.

Ethnicities were 88.7% European/Pākehā, 23.2% Māori, 0.6% Pacific peoples, 2.4% Asian, and 1.8% other ethnicities. People may identify with more than one ethnicity.

Although some people chose not to answer the census's question about religious affiliation, 58.3% had no religion, 28.6% were Christian, 0.6% had Māori religious beliefs, 1.2% were Muslim and 1.8% had other religions.

Of those at least 15 years old, 45 (12.6%) people had a bachelor's or higher degree, and 75 (21.0%) people had no formal qualifications. 63 people (17.6%) earned over $70,000 compared to 17.2% nationally. The employment status of those at least 15 was that 192 (53.8%) people were employed full-time, 54 (15.1%) were part-time, and 12 (3.4%) were unemployed.

Te Kawa statistical area

Te Kawa had a population of 1,209 at the 2018 New Zealand census, an increase of 135 people (12.6%) since the 2013 census, and an increase of 141 people (13.2%) since the 2006 census. There were 393 households, comprising 618 males and 591 females, giving a sex ratio of 1.05 males per female. The median age was 32.9 years (compared with 37.4 years nationally), with 330 people (27.3%) aged under 15 years, 225 (18.6%) aged 15 to 29, 528 (43.7%) aged 30 to 64, and 126 (10.4%) aged 65 or older.

Ethnicities were 88.1% European/Pākehā, 20.1% Māori, 2.2% Pacific peoples, 3.5% Asian, and 1.7% other ethnicities. People may identify with more than one ethnicity.

The percentage of people born overseas was 10.2, compared with 27.1% nationally.

Although some people chose not to answer the census's question about religious affiliation, 57.1% had no religion, 30.3% were Christian, 0.5% had Māori religious beliefs, 0.5% were Muslim and 1.7% had other religions.

Of those at least 15 years old, 114 (13.0%) people had a bachelor's or higher degree, and 165 (18.8%) people had no formal qualifications. The median income was $38,200, compared with $31,800 nationally. 144 people (16.4%) earned over $70,000 compared to 17.2% nationally. The employment status of those at least 15 was that 489 (55.6%) people were employed full-time, 141 (16.0%) were part-time, and 33 (3.8%) were unemployed.

Te Kawa hill 
The 'Geology of the Waikato Area' says, "The Alexandra Volcanic Group consists of several low-angle composite cones, including Karioi, Pirongia, Kakepuku, Te Kawa and Tokanui volcanoes, aligned southeast from Mount Karioi on the coast to Tokanui." It was formed in the Late Pliocene to earliest Pleistocene of subduction-related basaltic magmas. Te Kawa is the only Alexandra Volcanic with a crater remaining. Outcrops of coarse tuff and lapilli tuff are on the north and northeast sides of the crater and basalt boulders with augite megacrysts in the crater.

There are also several pits and terraces.

See also

References

Ōtorohanga District
Populated places in Waikato